CKCU-FM is a Canadian community-based campus radio station, broadcasting at 93.1 FM in Ottawa, and offering live and archived on-demand audio streams from its website. The station broadcasts 24 hours per day, 365 days per year.

The station's studios are located on the campus of Carleton University, on the fifth floor of the University Centre building. The station's signal is radiated from the Ryan Tower in the Gatineau Hills, along with most of Ottawa's other private and public radio stations, meaning that it enjoys full broadcast power and a listening area with a radius of 100 km.

History
CKCU Radio Carleton is Canada's oldest community-based campus radio station. On May 22, 1973, Carleton University Association Inc. was granted a licence from the CRTC to operate a carrier current AM station, operating on 670 kHz with power of only 16 watts. Its first broadcast at 93.1 FM on November 14, 1975 when it played Joni Mitchell's You Turn Me On, I'm a Radio.  CKCU broadcasts live 24 hours a day to a 100 km radius on FM 93.1.

CKCU airs over 100 different shows each week, including programs in 14 languages. The schedule includes both general and specialty music programs, public affairs and spoken word programming, and features many shows with a topical or international flavour.  Some shows feature live in-studio performances by local artists. CKCU actively supports, sponsors and promotes local independent musicians, venues, concerts and festivals.

Volunteers from the campus and community program and host all shows. Often dubbed the mighty 93 by devotees, CKCU has a freeform format that allows the hosts to pick all the music played, and has many community programs.

The listener-supported station has an annual funding drive in late October and early November, to raise money for its annual operating budget. In 2018, this raised over $140,000. Further money is raised from university student levies, along with revenue from advertisers and sponsors. The station self-produces much of the advertising material it carries, giving the advertising a campus flavour popular with listeners.

Each March break and several times during the summer, CKCU runs a unique Radio Camp for kids ages 10–14. The camp has been growing in popularity since 2001 and features a live two-hour kids broadcast.

CKCU-FM was included amongst other architecturally interesting and historically significant buildings in Doors Open Ottawa.

On July 3, 2020, a construction mishap knocked down the tower at CKCU-FM's building. The mishap severed the link between the studio and the transmitter site rendering the station silent. 
 The station was back on the air a month later <ref>https://charlatan.ca/2020/08/05/ckcu-returns-to-air-after-longest-ever-broadcast-disruption/<ref>. In the interim CKCU-FM audio was available to listen online over the internet.

Selected programs (Currently on)
The Back 40 - A program of traditional country, western, and bluegrass music.
Both Kinds of Music
Black & Blues
Canadian Spaces - A folk/roots/acoustic music show which has aired since 1980.
Earthgauge - environmental news and interviews hosted and produced by Mark Brooks.
Friday Morning Cartunes - Hosted by John Westhaver, of Birdman Sound fame.
In a Mellow Tone - A jazz program heard every Wednesday from 9 to 11pm.
The Filibuster - A political music/news show which airs every Monday morning at 9:00am 
The Red Zone - A weekly program dedicated to sports talk radio. Hosts debates and special features on a regular basis.
An Indian Morning - Hosted by Harsha Dehejia and Kishore Sampat, the show focuses on the music of India, including folk, classical and devotional and film music.
Special Blend - A morning show which airs weekdays from 7 to 10a.m., the show follows a talk/music format with a focus on current affairs, particularly news stories of local interest.
CKCU Literary News - An internet-based broadcasting service of CKCU-FM, affiliated with Carleton University in Ottawa. This service includes Literatures in Europe Today, Les actualités littéraires dans le monde francophone, hosted by Hans G. Ruprecht, alternating with Das Literarische Echo, co-hosted by Hans G. Ruprecht and Helmut Zobl.
Reggae in the Fields - hosted by Junior Smith, Saturdays, 3–5:30pm. Canada's longest-running radio program.
Swing Is in the Air - A weekly swing and mainstream jazz program.
This Island Earth - A world music program heard every Sunday from 1 to 4pm EST and hosted by the This Island Earth Collective.
Turn Up The Radio
Vintage Love
Whatever's Cool With Me - A general music show.
Barrio Latino - Latin Music Friday 6pm to 8pm
Heatwave hosted by Massive Vibes & Selecta Dri Dri.

Famous alumni
Ian Mendes
Jeremy Gara
Ken Rockburn
David Mowbray
Jeff Green
Jason Moscovitz
Rob Braide
Geoff Pevere
Chuck Rubin
Neil Bregman
Max Wallace
Adrian Harewood
Mike Ross
John Marshall
Michael Giunta
Nadine Gelineau
Casey Kenny

References

External links
CKCU-FM
 

Kcu
Carleton University
Kcu
Radio stations established in 1975
1975 establishments in Ontario